Tommaso Castello (born 14 August 1991) is a retired Italian rugby union player. His usual position was as a Centre, and he represented Italy on 18 occasions.	

For 2015–16 Pro12 season, he named like Additional Player for Zebre.
From 2016–17 Pro12 season to 2021–22 United Rugby Championship season, he played for Zebre.

In 2011 Castello was named in the Italy Under 20 squad and in 2012 and 2013 he was part of Emerging Italy squad. From 2016 he was also named in the Italy squad.

He retired from rugby on 27th December 2021 after failing to recover from an injury he suffered in March 2019.

References

External links
ESPN Profile
It's Rugby England Profile

1991 births
Living people
Italian rugby union players
Italy international rugby union players
Sportspeople from Genoa
Zebre Parma players
Rugby union centres
Rugby Calvisano players